Agathymus is a genus of butterflies in the skipper family, Hesperiidae. They occur in the North American deserts. The genus was described by Hugh Avery Freeman in 1959. The larvae bore into the stems of agave plants.

These butterflies have been treated as members of the disputed skipper subfamily Megathyminae, but are also considered sufficiently distinct to be in their own family, Megathymidae, along with the genera Megathymus and Stallingsia.

Species
species group unknown
Agathymus alliae (Stallings & Turner, 1957)
Agathymus aryxna (Dyar, 1905)
Agathymus belli (Freeman, 1955)
Agathymus carlsbadensis (Stallings & Turner, 1957)
Agathymus comstocki (Harbison, 1957)
Agathymus dawsoni Harbison, 1963
Agathymus diabloensis Freeman, 1962
Agathymus escalantei Stallings, Turner & Stallings, 1966
Agathymus estelleae (Stallings & Turner, 1958)
Agathymus evansi (Freeman, 1950)
Agathymus fieldi Freeman, 1960
Agathymus florenceae (Stallings & Turner, 1957)
Agathymus gentryi Roever, 1998
Agathymus gilberti Freeman, 1964
Agathymus hoffmanni (Freeman, 1952)
Agathymus indecisa (Butler & H. Druce, 1872)
Agathymus judithae (Stallings & Turner, 1957)
Agathymus mariae (Barnes & Benjamin, 1924)
Agathymus micheneri Stallings, Turner & Stallings, 1961
Agathymus neumoegeni (Edwards, 1882)
Agathymus polingi (Skinner, 1905)
Agathymus remingtoni (Stallings & Turner, 1958)
Agathymus rethon (Dyar, 1913)
Agathymus ricei Stallings, Turner & Stallings, 1966
Agathymus rindgei Freeman, 1964
Agathymus stephensi (Skinner, 1912)
The baueri species group
Agathymus baueri (Stallings & Turner, 1954)
Agathymus juliae (Stallings & Turner, 1958)

References

 , 1959, Lepid. News 12 (3/4): 82
 , 1960: Notes on Agathymus in Texas, and the description of a new species from Mexico (Megathymidae). Journal Lepidop. Soc. 14 (1): 58–62. Full article: 
 , 2004, Atlas of Neotropical Lepidoptera; Checklist: Part 4A; Hesperioidea-Papilionoidea.

External links

Erionotini
Hesperiidae genera